Calliophis nigriscens, commonly known as the black coral snake or striped coral snake, is a species of venomous elapid snake endemic to the Western Ghats, India.

Geographic range

Description
See snake scales for terms used.
Rostral broader than long; frontal as long as its distance from the end of the snout, much shorter than the parietals; one preocular and two postoculars; a single temporal; seven upper labials, third and fourth entering the eye; anterior chin shields as long as the posterior or a little shorter, in contact with four labials.

Dorsal scales in 13 rows. Ventrals 232–261; anal usually divided; subcaudals 33–44.

This species comprises several colour varieties, which are connected by insensible gradations; in all the head and nape are black, with an oblique yellow band, sometimes broken up into spots, on each side from the parietals to behind the angle of the mouth, and the upper lip is yellow in front of and behind the eye; lower parts uniform red.

Color variations include the following:
A. Dark purplish brown above, with three or five longitudinal series of black, light-edged spots.
B. The spots confluent and forming three longitudinal black bands edged with whitish.
C. Intermediate between A and B.
D. Dark purplish brown above, with three or five more or less distinct black stripes, which are not light-edged.
E. Pale reddish brown or red above, with five black stripes.

Total length ; tail .

References

Further reading
 Das I. 2002. A Photographic Guide to Snakes and Other Reptiles of India. Sanibel Island, Florida: Ralph Curtis Books. 144 pp. . (Calliophis nigriscens, p. 52).
 Günther A. 1862. On New Species of Snakes in the Collection of the British Museum. Ann. Mag. Nat. Hist., Series 3, 9: 124–132. (Callophis [sic] nigrescens, pp. 131–132).
 Slowinski, Joseph B.; Boundy, Jeff; Lawson, R. 2001. The phylogenetic relationships of Asian coral snakes (Elapidae: Calliophis and Maticora) based on morphological and molecular characters. Herpetologica 57 (2): 233–245.
 Smith MA. 1943. The Fauna of British India, Ceylon and Burma, Including the Whole of the Indo-Chinese Sub-region. Reptilia and Amphibia. Vol. III.—Serpentes. London: Secretary of State for India. (Taylor and Francis, printers). xii + 583 pp. (Callophis [sic] nigriscens, pp. 422–423).
 Vyas, Raju. 1988. Extension range of the striped coral snake (Callophis nigrescens). Hamadryad 13 (2): 3–4.

nigrescens
Snakes of India
Endemic fauna of India
Reptiles described in 1862
Taxa named by Albert Günther